The 1996 HEW Cyclassics was the inaugural edition of the HEW Cyclassics cycle race and was held on 25 August 1996. The race started and finished in Hamburg. The race was won by Rossano Brasi.

General classification

References

1996
1996 in German sport
1996 in road cycling
August 1996 sports events in Europe